Palm Shores is a town in Brevard County, Florida. The population was 900 at the 2010 United States Census. It is part of the Palm Bay–Melbourne–Titusville Metropolitan Statistical Area.

Geography

Government

In 2007, the town had a taxable real estate base of $64.67 million. It is the only municipality in the county to have its tax base rise in 2008.

Demographics

At the 2000 census there were 794 people, 328 households, and 224 families in the town. The racial makeup of the town was 88.04% White, 4.41% African American, 0.50% Native American, 3.27% Asian, 0.50% Pacific Islander, 1.01% from other races, and 2.27% from two or more races. Hispanic or Latino of any race were 4.28%.

Of the 328 households 29.0% had children under the age of 18 living with them, 59.8% were married couples living together, 6.4% had a female householder with no husband present, and 31.7% were non-families. 26.5% of households were one person and 10.1% were one person aged 65 or older. The average household size was 2.42 and the average family size was 2.96.

The age distribution was 22.0% under the age of 18, 5.4% from 18 to 24, 26.7% from 25 to 44, 29.7% from 45 to 64, and 16.1% 65 or older. The median age was 43 years. For every 100 females, there were 98.5 males. For every 100 females age 18 and over, there were 98.4 males.

The median household income was $47,500 and the median family income  was $63,333. Males had a median income of $38,194 versus $26,000 for females. The per capita income for the town was $22,390. About 5.7% of families and 9.3% of the population were below the poverty line, including 12.6% of those under age 18 and 10.0% of those age 65 or over.

References

External links

 

Towns in Brevard County, Florida
Towns in Florida
Populated places on the Intracoastal Waterway in Florida